What You Believe may refer to:

"What You Believe", song by Techno Twins
"What You Believe", song by Orange County pop punk band Big Drill Car No Worse for the Wear 1994   
"What You Believe", song by Canadian singer Luba Between the Earth & Sky
"What You Believe", song by Jonathan Davis from Black Labyrinth 2018